Summerholm is a rural locality in the Lockyer Valley Region, Queensland, Australia. In the  Summerholm had a population of 639 people.

History 
Summer Hill Provisional School opened on 1889. On 1 January 1909 it was became Summer Hill State School. In 1944 it was renamed Summerholm State School. It closed circa 1955.

In the  Summerholm had a population of 639 people.

References 

Lockyer Valley Region
Localities in Queensland